WJYW ("Star 88.3") is a local radio station licensed to Union City, Indiana and broadcasting from neighboring Union City, Ohio at 88.9 MHz.

WJYW also operates the following FM translator in the Richmond, Indiana area:

References

External links
Official WJYW site (with streaming audio)
 

Randolph County, Indiana
Darke County, Ohio
Contemporary Christian radio stations in the United States
Radio stations established in 1999
1999 establishments in Indiana
JYW